Barnsley Hospital is an acute general hospital in Barnsley, South Yorkshire, England. It is managed by the Barnsley Hospital NHS Foundation Trust.

History
The hospital has its origins in the Barnsley Union Workhouse Infirmary which opened in 1852. It was expanded in 1875 and a new purpose-built infirmary, designed with a pavilion layout, was completed in 1883. It became Barnsley Municipal Hospital in 1930 but was renamed St Helen Hospital in 1935, before joining the National Health Service in 1948.

A major redevelopment of the site to create Barnsley District General Hospital was completed in 1977. The facility became known as Barnsley Hospital in 2005.

In 2021 an extension to the emergency department was opened which brings together the hospital’s previous paediatric units into a single location.

Arms

References

NHS hospitals in England
Hospitals in South Yorkshire
Buildings and structures in Barnsley